The Rochester and Lake Ontario Railroad was incorporated May 17, 1852; it was merged September 30, 1855, into the New York Central Railroad.

References

External links
Rochester & Lake Ontario Rail-Road Company (StockLobster)
Rochester and Lake Ontario Railroad Memorabilia Value Guide (Railroad Antiquities)

Predecessors of the New York Central Railroad
Defunct New York (state) railroads
Railway companies established in 1852
Railway companies disestablished in 1855
1852 establishments in New York (state)